Sørkappfonna is a glaciated area in Sørkapp Land at Spitsbergen, Svalbard. It has a length of about fourteen kilometers, and a width of about five kilometers. The glacier debouches both into Stormbukta at the western coast, and into Isbukta at the eastern coast of Spitsbergen.

See also
List of glaciers in Svalbard

References

Glaciers of Spitsbergen